Jørgen Peter Müller (7 October 1866 - 17 November 1938) was a Danish gymnastics educator and author. He is also known as J. P. Muller.

Biography

His book Mit System (My System), published in 1904, was a bestseller and has been translated to English and many other languages. My System explains Müller's philosophy of health and provides guidelines for the 18 exercises that comprise the system, as well as photographic instructions featuring Müller himself. The book was the most successful physical culture book published in Britain during the early twentieth century. Müller moved to London and opened a physical culture institute in 1912.

Much of what was stated in his system has since been accepted by the medical community, with many of his basic movements being used in modern-day physical therapy and rehabilitation. The emphasis on body-weight exercise and the use of dynamic stretching is useful for many people, and has been found appropriate in a wide range of patients. As well as exercises, stretching and breathing routines, Müller also advocated a towel-rubbing routine to follow a daily bath, the benefits of fresh air, and warned against the dangers of wearing too many clothes.

In some cases he re-wrote his books himself in English, rather than have them translated directly from the Danish.

Müller was appointed Knight of the Dannebrog in 1919.

Müller had three sons named Ib, Per and Bror who featured in pictures in his books.

Selected publications 

 My System, 1904
 Vink om sundhedsrøgt og idræt, 1907
 The Fresh Air book, 1908
 My System for Children, 1913
 My System for Ladies, 1913
 My Breathing System, 1914
 The Daily Five Minutes, 1924

References

External links
Many of Müller's works are available to read online.
 My System at The Internet Archive
 Mein System at the Wellcome Library
 The Fresh Air Book at the Internet Archive
 My Breathing System at the Wellcome Library
 My System for Children at the Wellcome Library
 My System for Ladies at the Wellcome Library
 Vink om sundhedsrøgt og idræt at the Wellcome Library

1866 births
1938 deaths
19th-century Danish people
20th-century Danish people
Danish educators
People associated with physical culture
People from Guldborgsund Municipality